Hanna Kiep (February 10, 1904, in Braunschweig⁣ – August 22, 1979, in Pullach) was a German lawyer, diplomat, and functionary of the German Red Cross (DRC).

In 1946, she became a member of the DRK executive board, working for the World Organization of Mothers of All Nations and the German Housewives Association. After the founding of the Federal Republic of Germany, she joined the diplomatic service in 1949 and from 1951 to 1969 was a women's secretary at the German Consulate General in New York.

References

1904 births
1979 deaths
Jurists from Lower Saxony
German women lawyers
20th-century German lawyers
People from Braunschweig
Officers Crosses of the Order of Merit of the Federal Republic of Germany
20th-century women lawyers
20th-century German women